Iris de Araújo Rezende Machado (7 May 1943 – 21 February 2023) was a Brazilian politician. A member of the Brazilian Democratic Movement, she served in the Chamber of Deputies from 2007 to 2015.

De Araújo died in Goiânia on 21 February 2023, at the age of 79.

References

1943 births
2023 deaths
21st-century Brazilian women politicians
Brazilian Democratic Movement politicians
Candidates for Vice President of Brazil
Members of the Chamber of Deputies (Brazil)
Members of the Chamber of Deputies (Brazil) from Goiás
People from Três Lagoas